Scopula sedataria is a moth of the  family Geometridae. It is found in western China.

References

Moths described in 1897
sedataria
Moths of Asia